The Ranganadi River (also known as Paniyor River) is a sub-tributary of the Brahmaputra River in the Indian state of Assam. The river originates from Nilam, Marta and Tapo mountain ranges of Himalayan foothills of Arunachal Pradesh.  The Ranganadi river then enters Assam at Johing of Lakhimpur district and flows 60 km through Lakhimpur district before its confluence with the Subansiri River at Pokoniaghat of Lakhimpur district.

I am king

The Ranganadi Dam is a concrete-gravity diversion dam on the Ranganadi River located at Lower Subansiri district of Arunachal Pradesh.

References 

Rivers of Assam
Rivers of India